B roads may refer to:
 B roads in Australia, secondary highways 
 B roads in Belgium, connecting roads (see :nl:Lijst van Belgische B-wegen or :fr:Liste des bretelles de Belgique) 
 B roads in Cyprus, main roads
 B roads in Germany are Bundesstraßen
 B roads in the Isle of Man
 B roads in Jamaica
 B roads in Kenya, major roads
 B roads in Malaysia, roads in the Malaysian state of Selangor
 B roads in Namibia
 Numbered local routes in the United Kingdom:
 B roads in Great Britain 
 B roads in Northern Ireland
 In the United States:
 County-designated highways in zone B in Michigan
 Corridor B, a highway in the U.S. states of North Carolina, Tennessee, Virginia, Kentucky, and Ohio

See also 
 List of B1 roads